The Oklahoma State Cowboys wrestling team is the most successful NCAA Division I program of all time in any sport. As of 2021-2022, Oklahoma State wrestling has won 34 team national championships, 143 individual NCAA championships, and 483 All-American honors.

History
Cowboy wrestling extends back to 1914–15 when A.M. Colville led the first team at what was then Oklahoma A&M.  That team lost the school's first dual meet to Texas.  The next season, athletic director Edward C. Gallagher would take over the team. He coached the first national championship team in 1928. He was also the coach of eight of the first ten national champions as his teams won in 1928, 1929, 1930, 1934, 1935, 1937, 1938, 1939, and 1940. Only a strong 1936 Oklahoma team coached by Paul Keen kept him from sweeping the first 10 official NCAA Championships. He coached 50 official All-Americans and 26 official individual champions in the earliest days of the tournament.

Following Gallagher's death in 1940, A&M to find a coach who could continue their winning tradition. For that task, the Cowboys turned to Art Griffith, longtime coach at Central High School in Tulsa.  In 15 years, Griffith he won 94 of 100 matches, including 50 in a row at one point. Once he arrived in Stillwater, Griffith picked up where Gallagher left off, winning eight national championships in 13 years. He also continued two streaks left by Gallagher. First, he extended the four consecutive championships Gallagher had left with to seven, finally losing out in 1947 to Cornell. Second, he extended the 27 consecutive dual meet victory streak to 76, before finally losing in 1951. Griffith's wrestlers won 27 individual championships and were All-Americans 64 times from 1941–1956. He retired on top after winning three consecutive NCAA Championships and going 78-7-4 for his career, including ten undefeated teams.

One of Griffith's wrestlers, Myron Roderick, was chosen to immediately succeed his former coach following his retirement in 1956. As a wrestler for Griffith, Roderick went 42–2 and became a three-time national champion from 1954–1956. After he returned from the 1956 Olympics, he took over as head coach. His first team was one of his least successful, finishing fourth at nationals with only one champion and three All-Americans to his credit. However, his 1957–58 and 1958–59 teams dominated the NCAA tournament, winning in convincing fashion with four champions and 15 All-Americans between the two years. His 1960 team couldn't compete with a much stronger Oklahoma team coached by Thomas Evans. However, Roderick's teams once again rebounded with championship wins in 1961 and 1962, winning five individual championships and another 15 All-Americans. By the end of his career in 1969, he had coached seven team champions, 20 individual champions, and 79 All-Americans.

The dual success continued into the 1970s and 80s, with Tommy Chesbro leading the way from 1969-84. However, the NCAA title train ended during this time. He only won one national title, in part because his tenure mostly coincided with the sudden rise of Iowa wrestling under Dan Gable. The Cowboys won only one title under Chesbro’s watch. Still, Chesbro managed to pass Gallagher as the winningest coach in school history. His dual mark of 227-26-0 would remain the best record in the history of the program until it was surpassed by current coach John Smith.

Smith took over the Cowboy wrestling program in 1991 in the wake of NCAA sanctions and probation left over from previous head coach Joe Seay, who had won two national titles with a 114-18-2 overall record. Smith’s first season saw the Cowboys take second at Nationals, but his second season was crippled by the probation. The Pokes went 4–7 and were banned from post-season competition. But the next season, the Cowboys were back as top wrestlers who had taken a redshirt year during the probation (such as four-time champion, and current assistant coach Pat Smith and Alan Fried) were back on the mat. OSU went 13–1 that year and won the team title.

The middle part of the 90s, however, saw the OSU program grow somewhat stagnant, at least by Cowboy standards. Wrestlers were still winning individual titles and claiming All-American honors and the team was still winning Big Eight and Big 12 Conference crowns, but their showings at Nationals were disappointing. Between 1995–2002, the Cowboys placed no better than second (once, in 1997) and finished third three times (1998, 1999, 2001). But in 2002, the Cowboys were back in the saddle once again, winning the conference and NCAA titles and sporting a 17–0 record. It would be the first of four straight national championships (2003–06), firmly reestablishing OSU's dominance in the wrestling world. The Cowboys were at their peak from 2002 to 2005, when they sported a combined record of 55–2. Smith currently has 239 wins as coach at OSU, the most ever in school history.

Noteworthy alumni
Oklahoma State has had a number of key wrestlers that have been crucial to strengthening their program throughout the years. Yojiro Uetake, an Oklahoma State wrestler originally from Japan, is a prime example of this. To this day, Uetake holds the title of the only Cowboy wrestler to remain undefeated throughout his entire college career, ending with a record of 58 wins and no losses.  Also during his time as a 130-pound wrestler for OSU, Uetake won a total of three individual Big 8 and national championships.  After graduating in Stillwater, Uetake was an assistant coach for the Cowboys for two years before moving back home to Japan, where he now coaches wrestling at the high school he attended.  In 2015, Uetake was inducted into the Oklahoma Sports Hall of Fame.
Another key wrestler in the Cowboys' success is Alex Dieringer.  Dieringer graduated from OSU in 2016, but earned many significant wins during his time in Stillwater.  Between 2013 and 2016, he was not only a three-time NCAA champion, but also a four-time NCAA All-American and a four-time Big 12 champion.  Dieringer was nominated for, but did not win, the ESPY award for Male College Athlete of the Year.  He did, however, win the award for Oklahoma State Male Athlete of the Year in 2016.  That same year, he won a Dan Hodge Trophy and ended his college career with 133 wins and only four losses.  Since graduating from Oklahoma State, Dieringer placed third in the U.S. Olympic Trials, in the U.S. World Team Trials, and in the U.S. Open.

Big 12 successes
Oklahoma State wrestling is known for its consistent success in the annual Big 12 championship tournament.  Out of the 23 trophies won throughout the tournament's history, OSU has earned 17 of them.  During this event in March 2019, OSU won its seventh Big 12 team title in a row, making this the longest consecutive winning streak ever in Big 12 wrestling.  This win also completed OSU's greatest amount of sequential conference tournament wins since their success in the 1920s.

Current roster 2022-2023

Home meets

Home meets are held in the 13,611 seat Gallagher-Iba Arena in Stillwater. The arena is named in part after Oklahoma State's legendary wrestling coach Edward C. Gallagher. Gallagher-Iba was known as Gallagher Hall for nearly five decades until the name was amended to honor former Oklahoma State basketball coach Henry Iba upon the facility's first renovation during the 1987–1988 season. Oklahoma State has held their home wrestling meets in the arena since its completion in 1938. The arena was formally dedicated on February 3, 1939, during a wrestling dual versus Indiana. During the December 9, 2005 Bedlam wrestling dual, a permanently reserved seat for Gallagher was unveiled, adjacent to a reserved seat for Iba.

The venerable arena has long played a part in the history and legends of the OSU wrestling program. It has long been known as one of the most hostile arenas in the nation, a reputation made during its first half-century. During the 1978 Big 8 wrestling championships, a standing-room-only crowd of 8,300 made such a huge roar that many of the lights in the arena burst. Gallagher-Iba has also seen many long undefeated streaks for the Pokes, including 34 unbeaten and untied seasons at home. The home mat advantage for the Pokes and the ravenous attitude of Cowboy fans led to the arena's nickname "Gallagher's House of Horrors."

Gallagher-Iba underwent a massive renovation project in 2000 and 2001, which included an expansion of the seating capacity from 6,381 to the present 13,611. While the expansion project caused attendance at basketball games to almost double, the wrestling crowds have yet to pack the arena to the rafters as they did in the original Gallagher Hall. However, attendance usually spikes when rivals come to Stillwater, most notably the Iowa Hawkeyes, Minnesota Golden Gophers, and Bedlam foe Oklahoma. While the unruly atmosphere has been somewhat diminished, the renovation project has yielded positives for the Cowboy wrestling program. Among which are the new wrestling center and other new training facilities built inside the athletics center, much to the benefit all OSU student-athletes.

Bedlam Series

Despite the overwhelming mainstream popularity of the games played on the gridiron and hardwood, the Bedlam Series roots lie on the wrestling mat. In fact, the term 'Bedlam' used to describe this intrastate rivalry has its roots based in the rivalry that brewed between the schools' prestigious wrestling programs. The term is said to have been born on the night of a particularly heated wrestling dual in Stillwater at Gallagher Hall. As the story goes, a newspaper writer was said to have emerged from the building exclaiming to others outside, "It's bedlam in there!"

Oklahoma State holds a seemingly insurmountable advantage in the wrestling series, which began in 1920. The Cowboys own an impressive 147-27-10 record against the Sooners through the 2021-22 season. While normally this sort of one-sided advantage can be attributed to one school being rather weak, the Bedlam domination by Oklahoma State is very different in that Oklahoma is a national wrestling power in its own right. Oklahoma has won seven team national championships in its history, while Oklahoma State has won a record 34 team national titles. This dominance over such a highly touted rival has long been a source of great pride for Oklahoma State fans. In recent years, Oklahoma has moved its home duals from the Lloyd Noble Center back to its former home, McCasland Field House, in part to prevent Cowboy fans from dominating the atmosphere despite being the visiting team.

Dan Hodge Trophy winners

2016 – Alex Dieringer
2005 – Steve Mocco

Notable Cowboy wrestlers

 Obe Blanc – member of 2010 U.S. Freestyle Wrestling World Team
 Douglas Blubaugh – Olympic gold medalist in freestyle wrestling at 1960 Summer Olympics, NCAA National Champion
 Jack Brisco – NCAA Champion and two-time All-American, professional wrestler
 Daniel Cormier – UFC Light-Heavyweight and Heavyweight Champion, UFC color commentator, former NCAA national finalist and Olympic wrestler
 Kendall Cross – NCAA National Champion, gold medalist at 1996 Summer Olympics in freestyle wrestling
 Randy Couture – two-time UFC Champion and UFC Hall of Famer
 Kyle Crutchmer – MMA fighter, two-time NCAA All-American
 Harold DeMarsh – first ever NCAA Wrestling Champion in 1928
 Alex Dieringer – three-time NCAA National Champion and four-time All-American, 2016 Dan Hodge Trophy winner
 Bobby Douglas – two-time World medalist in freestyle wrestling
 Don Frye – UFC fighter
 Eddie Griffin – two-time NCAA Champion, later served as a collegiate wrestling head coach and athletic director
 Dean Heil – two-time NCAA Champion and three-time All-American
 Johny Hendricks – UFC Welterweight Champion and two-time NCAA Champion
 Cliff Keen – head wrestling coach at University of Michigan from 1925–1970
 Muhammed Lawal – NCAA All-American wrestler and former OSU assistant coach
 Frank Lewis – Olympic gold medalist in freestyle wrestling at 1936 Summer Olympics, NCAA National Champion and two-time finalist
 Steve Mocco – MMA fighter, Olympian in freestyle wrestling at 2008 Summer Olympics, NCAA National Champion and two-time finalist at OSU
 Kenny Monday – NCAA National Champion, two-time Olympic medalist, gold medalist at 1988 Summer Olympics in freestyle wrestling
 Mark Muñoz – UFC Middleweight fighter
 Ray Murphy Jr. – All-American, awarded the 1998 Medal of Courage from the National Wrestling Hall of Fame
 Jordan Oliver – two-time NCAA National Champion and four-time All-American, 2019 US National Champion and 2020 US Olympic Team Trials champion in freestyle wrestling
 Robert Pearce – Olympic gold medalist in freestyle wrestling at 1932 Summer Olympics, NCAA National Champion and two-time finalist
 Chris Pendleton – two-time NCAA National Champion and three-time All-American
 Myron Roderick – Olympic freestyle wrestler at 1956 Summer Olympics, three-time NCAA National Champion, won seven NCAA team championships as head coach of OSU
 Shane Roller – Bellator fighter and former Strikeforce Champion 
 Jake Rosholt – MMA fighter and three-time NCAA Champion
 Jared Rosholt – UFC fighter and 2010 NCAA finalist
 Coleman Scott – NCAA National Champion and four-time All-American, bronze medalist at 2012 Summer Olympics in freestyle wrestling
 John Smith – two-time NCAA National Champion and six-time World Level freestyle wrestling Champion with two Olympic gold medals (1988 and 1992) and four World Wrestling Championships. Five-time National Championship head coach of the Cowboy Wrestling program.
 Pat Smith – younger brother of John Smith, first ever four-time NCAA Division I National Champion
 Yojiro Uetake – two-time Olympic gold medalist in freestyle wrestling at 1964 and 1968 Summer Olympics, three-time undefeated NCAA National Champion
 Jack van Bebber – Olympic gold medalist in freestyle wrestling at 1932 Summer Olympics, three-time NCAA National Champion
 Shelby Wilson – Olympic gold medalist in freestyle wrestling at 1960 Summer Olympics, two-time NCAA finalist

See also
National Wrestling Hall of Fame and Museum

References

External links

 
1914 establishments in Oklahoma
Sports clubs established in 1914